Shalako is a 1962 Western novel by Louis L'Amour and the name of a town that the author intended to build. It would have been a working town typical of those of the nineteenth-century Western frontier. Funding for the project fell through, and Shalako, which would have been named in honor of the protagonist of the novel, was never built.

Film adaptation
The novel was made into the film Shalako in 1968 starring Sean Connery and Brigitte Bardot.

References

Western (genre) novels
Novels by Louis L'Amour
American novels adapted into films
Western United States in fiction
1962 American novels